The Stanley Motor Carriage Company was an American manufacturer of steam cars; it operated from 1902 to 1924. The cars made by the company were colloquially called Stanley Steamers, although several different models were produced.

Early history

Twins Francis E. Stanley (1849–1918) and Freelan O. Stanley (1849–1940) founded the company, after selling their photographic dry plate business to Eastman Kodak. They made their first car in 1897. During 1898 and 1899, they produced and sold over 200 cars, more than any other U.S. maker. 

In 1899, Freelan and his wife Flora drove one of their cars to the top of Mount Washington in New Hampshire, the highest peak in the northeastern United States. The Stanleys later sold the rights to this early design to Locomobile. In 1902 they formed their own Stanley Motor Carriage Company.

Specifications and design 

Early Stanley cars had light wooden bodies mounted on tubular steel frames with full-elliptic springs. Steam was generated in a vertical fire-tube boiler, mounted beneath the seat, with a vaporizing gasoline (later, kerosene) burner underneath. The boiler was reinforced by several layers of piano wire wound around it, which gave it a strong but relatively light-weight shell. In early models, the vertical fire-tubes were made of copper, and were expanded into holes in the upper and lower crown sheets. In later models, the installation of a condenser caused oil-fouling in the expansion joints, and welded steel fire-tubes had to be used. The boilers were reasonably safe since they were fitted with safety valves. Even if these failed, any dangerous over pressure would rupture one of the joints long before the boiler shell itself could burst. The resulting leakage would relieve the boiler pressure and douse the burner with very little risk to the passenger. There is not a single documented incident of a Stanley boiler exploding.

The engine had two double-acting cylinders, side-by-side and equipped with slide-valves, and it was a simple-expansion type. Drive was transmitted directly by the crankshaft to a rear-mounted differential using a chain. Owners often modified their Locomobiles by adding third-party accessories, including improved lubricators, condensers, and devices which eased the laborious starting procedure.

To overcome patent difficulties with the design they had sold to Locomobile, the Stanley brothers developed a new model with twin-cylinder engines geared directly to the rear axle. Later models had aluminium coachwork that resembled the internal combustion cars of the time, but they retained steam-car features by having no transmission, clutch, or driveshaft. They also had a fully sprung tubular steel frame.

When they later moved the steam boiler to the front of the vehicle, the owners dubbed it the "coffin nose." In order to improve range, condensers were added from 1915.

A Stanley Steamer set the world record for the fastest mile in an automobile (28.2 seconds) in 1906. The record for steam-powered automobiles was not broken until 2009.

Production rose to 500 cars in 1917.

The Stanley Steamer was sometimes nicknamed "The Flying Teapot". At least one Stanley Steamer found its way to Castle Hill, New South Wales, Australia where it was driven in the late 1920s.

Obsolescence 
During the mid to late 1910s, the fuel efficiency and power delivery of internal combustion engines improved dramatically and using an electric starter instead of the crank, which had been notorious for injuring its operators, led to the rise of the gasoline-powered automobile, which also was much cheaper. The Stanley company produced a series of advertising campaigns trying to recover the car-buying public away from the "internal explosion engine," but it was unsuccessful. Their advertising slogan was, "Power – Correctly Generated, Correctly Controlled, Correctly Applied to the Rear Axle." These were early examples of the fear, uncertainty and doubt advertising campaign, since their aim was not to convince buyers of the advantages of the Stanley Steamer but to suggest that internal combustion automobiles could explode.

Sale and closure 
Francis died in 1918 when he steered his car off the road into a woodpile while attempting to avoid farm wagons travelling side by side. After his death, Freelan sold his interests to Prescott Warren. The company suffered a period of decline and technological stagnation. Better cars were now available at much lower cost. For example, a 1924 Stanley 740D sedan cost $3,950, compared with less than $500 for a Ford Model T. The widespread use of electric starters in internal combustion cars, beginning in 1912, eroded the remaining technological advantages of the steam car.

The smaller scale of merchandising, a lack of effective advertising, and the general desire of motorists for higher speeds and faster starting than offered by Stanley vehicles were the primary causes of the company's demise. The factory closed permanently in 1924.

In popular culture 
A song titled "The Stanley Steamer" appears in the 1948 film Summer Holiday starring  Mickey Rooney and Gloria DeHaven. The number, written by Harry Warren with lyrics by Ralph Blane, features an extended musical sequence with what appears to be a fairly early yellow 10 HP model. Stanley from Cars and Cars 2 who appeared in Time Travel Mater is a Stanley Steamer. Another Stanley Steamer appears in the 1965 film The Great Race starring Jack Lemmon and Tony Curtis, with Natalie Wood as the driver of the car. And a Stanley Steamer appears in the 2003 film Seabiscuit.  

Boston Red Sox pitcher Bob Stanley was nicknamed "Stanley Steamer".

Gallery

See also

Amzi L. Barber
Francis Edgar StanleyFreelan Oscar Stanley  
History of steam road vehicles
John Brisben Walker
Locomobile Company of America
Marshall Steam Museum
Mobile Company of America
Steam car
Steam engine
Timeline of steam power

References

External links

 Stanley Steamer – Technical Information
 Stanley Steamers in the Marshall Steam Museum
 Stanley Register Online – Worldwide register of existing Stanley steam cars
Steam cars
Defunct motor vehicle manufacturers of the United States
Brass Era vehicles
Vintage vehicles
American companies established in 1902
Vehicle manufacturing companies established in 1902
Vehicle manufacturing companies disestablished in 1924
Defunct manufacturing companies based in Massachusetts
Cars introduced in 1902
1900s cars
1910s cars
1920s cars